Roman Kontšek (born 11 June 1970) is a Slovak ice hockey player. He competed in the men's tournaments at the 1994 Winter Olympics and the 1998 Winter Olympics.

Career statistics

Regular season and playoffs

International

References

1970 births
Living people
Czechoslovak ice hockey left wingers
Olympic ice hockey players of Slovakia
Ice hockey players at the 1994 Winter Olympics
Ice hockey players at the 1998 Winter Olympics
Sportspeople from Žilina
HC Košice players
HK Dukla Trenčín players
HC Oceláři Třinec players
Washington Capitals draft picks
Expatriate ice hockey players in Italy
Slovak expatriate sportspeople in Italy
Slovak ice hockey left wingers
Slovak expatriate ice hockey players in the Czech Republic